was a town located in Awa District, Chiba Prefecture, Japan.

As of August 1, 2004, the town had an estimated population of 5,780 and a density of 131 persons per km2. The total area was 44.11 km2.

Geography
Maruyama was located at the southeast end of Chiba Prefecture, in an inland area of the southern Bōsō Peninsula, with a small shoreline facing the Pacific Ocean. The town had a temperate maritime climate with hot, humid summers and mild, cool winters.

History
Maruyama Town was created on March 15, 1955 from the merger of former Maru Village, Toyota Village and a portion of Chikura Town. It expanded on September 1, 1956 through the annexation of a portion of former Minamihara Village.

On March 20, 2006, Maruyama, along with the towns of Chikura, Shirahama, Tomiura, Tomiyama and Wada, and the village of Miyoshi (all from Awa District), was merged to create the city of Minamibōsō.

Economy
The economy of Maruyama was largely based on horticulture (primarily herbs and flowers), and summer tourism. Until 2020 it had a Shakespeare Country Park.

Transportation

Highway
Japan National Route 128
Japan National Route 410

References

External links
Minamibōsō official website 

Dissolved municipalities of Chiba Prefecture
Minamibōsō